Maria is the title given to a Filipino (Tagalog language) version of Cinderella collected by Fletcher Gardner and published in The Journal of American Folklore, in 1906. The story is related both to the international Cinderella narrative, as well as to the motif of the calumniated wife.

Source
According to Fletcher Gardner, the tale was collected from an informant named Cornelio, in Mangarin, Mindoro, in 1903. The informant heard the story from a man in Marinduque Island.

Summary
In this tale, the Cinderella-like character is named Maria. The girl lives with her father and her mother. One day, his father falls in love with another woman and kills his wife, marrying the other woman and making her Maria's stepmother.

The girl's family life becomes difficult for her, since the stepmother begins to impose hard tasks for her. One day, the stepmother kills Maria's pet pig and gives the girl ten pieces of its refuse, ordering her to wash them in the river. She warns the girl not to lose any piece during the washing, lest Maria is beaten to death as punishment.

Maria takes the pig's pieces and washes them in the river, but one slips away from her. A crocodile offers to bring it back to her. When he turns to dive in the river, the crocodile's tail splashes a bit of water on her forehead and it creates a shining jewel. Maria returns home and, inquired by her stepmother, tells her the incident at the river. The stepmother sends her own daughter to the river with a second pig's refuse, hoping the same fortune will befall her, but the crocodile splashes her with his tail and a bell appears on her head, which she has to hide under a rag.

Feeling humiliated, Maria's stepmother still hates her step-daughter and keeps forcing chores on the girl until her body is filthy and dirty. The stepmother orders Maria to clean herself in the river. A crab offers to wash her back and tells her to eat it and bury its shell in the yard. Maria follows the crab's advice and a lukban (grape fruit) tree sprouts in the yard.

Some time later, Maria's stepmother and her daughter go to church, while they leave Maria to prepare the food for them when they return. After they leave, an old woman appears to Maria and tells her to pluck a fruit from the lukban tree and go to church, while she prepares the food. Maria cracks open a fruit and discovers princess garments and a carriage with eight horses. Maria wears the garments and rides the carriage to church.

At church, Maria catches the king's attention, who sends some guards to inquire about her. When the guards go to see her, Maria her slipped from church, but leaves a shoe at church. She runs back home, takes off the garments and places them back into the lukban fruit, and waits for her step-family to come home.

Back to the king, he finds the shoe and orders a "bando" to seek every available woman and girl in the kingdom and bring them to the palace to try on the shoe. Maria's step-family ties her up inside a sack and leave by the fireplace, then go to the palace. None of the maidens fit the slipper, so the king sends the bando again. The soldiers go to Maria's home, and, alerted by the cooing of a bird, release her from the sack and she tries on the slipper. It fits.

The king marries Maria, despite her step-family's protests, and she goes to live in the palace. After a while, the king departs for war, and leaves his wife Maria in the care of her stepmother and two wise woman, with orders to hoist a white flag for good news and a black flag for bad news.

Maria is pregnant with seven boys; her step-mother and the midwives  replace the boys for blind puppies, throw the septuplets in the sea in a box and hoist a black flag to warn the king. He returns from war and, seeing the little animals, orders his wife to be punished, first by placing her under the stairs, then locking her up in a hut next to the palace.

As for the boys, they are saved by an enchanter and taken to his cave. The children grow up. One day, a hunter passes by the cave and sees the boys, then reports it back to the old women. Tyring to hide their misdeeds, the women go to the cave and give the boys poisoned maruya. The children eat it and die. The enchanter places the bodies inside a cave, but his oracle's voice tells him to seek the mother of the Sun, who lives in a distant place, beyond seven mountains, for a remedy.

He passes by three places where people ask him the solution for their problems: a tree asks why the bird do not perch on it; why two men are sat on a tree; and why two meager oxen eat rich grass and look emaciated and a black oxen looks fat by eating dust. The enchanter promises them he will bring the answers after visiting the house of the sun (tale type ATU 461, "Three Hairs of the Devil's Beard"). He then enters the house of the Sun, and is greeted by the Sun's mother, who hides him from the Sun after he comes back home. The Sun's mother asks him about the people's questions and gives the enchanter the remedy.

The enchanter goes back to his cave and resurrects the princes, who, after the enchanter's long journey, have become young men. When he and his brother wake up, the youngest of them goes to the tree to fetch a branch of silver and gold. The enchanter melds the metals and makes clothes and equipment (sabres, belts and a horn) for the seven princes.

The seven brothers blow on the horn to summon the king, who invites them for a banquet. Following the enchanter's warning, they give the meat on their dish to a dog, and the dog dies. The king replaces the cooks. The seven princes, before they sit again, ask the king to bring the woman locked in the hut to eat with them at the table. The woman, Maria, is brought to the table, and a stream of her breastmilk gushes forth and enters the mouth of the youngest son. The king realizes the seven young men are his sons, and punishes Maria's stepmother and the two midwives.

Analysis

Tale type 
The first part of the tale is a variant of the Cinderella tale, which corresponds to tale type ATU 510A, "Cinderella", of the international Aarne-Thompson-Uther Index. The second part of the tale is classified as type ATU 707, "The Three Golden Children".

According to German folklorist Hans-Jörg Uther, in his 2004 revision of the international index, both tale types (ATU 510A and ATU 707) are "usual combinations" for each other.

Motifs 
Scholarship points to an old belief connecting breastmilk and "natal blood", as observed in the works of Aristotle and Galen. Thus, the breastmilk motif reinforces the mother's connection to her children. Ethnologue  and Africanist Sigrid Schmidt relate this motif to Indian variants.

Variants

Philippines 
Author Dean Fansler collected a story titled The Wicked Woman's Reward, from one Gregorio Frondoso, a Bicol from Camarines. This tale shows the rivalry between two concubines of the king: one substitutes the other's son for a cat.

Professor Damiana Eugenio listed Thai tale The Four Champa Trees and Chinese tale Cat in Exchange for a Prince as "foreign analogues" to Filipino versions of the story of the king's wife banished from the palace due to the concubine's intrigue and accusations of giving birth to animals.

In another Filipino variant of Cinderella, collected in 1903 from a sixty-year-old woman in Pola, Mindoro, as the continuation of the story, after the marriage, the Cinderella-like character, named Maria, gives birth to seven princes, who are replaced by seven puppies and exposed in the mountains. However, they are saved by a "mother of the day" or "mother of the sun" (ina nang arao) and become seven young men. One day, they pass by their mother, suffering the king's punishment.

Dean Fansler, in another article, summarized a metrical romance published in the archipelago, The Story of the Life of Maria in the Kingdom of Hungary, and showed that it was a combination of Cinderella and Constance. However, the tale contains the punishment of the mother, now disgraced, and the lives of her sons, abandoned in the mountains and saved by a shepherd. He also published another (lesser-known) metrical romance, and a folktale, Amelia ("current in the province of Laguna"), which largely follow the same plot structure: marriage, birth of child or children, replacement by animals, severe punishment of the mother, rescue of children, meeting with parents later in life. Author Neil Philip suggests that Life of Maria romance was the ultimate source for Cornelio's tale.

In a tale published by Yukihiro Yamada and collected in 1987, from teller Quintina Cabal Gutierrez (Itbayat), papito so pipatoran (The Seven Kingdoms), three sisters, Magdalena, Rosalina and Maria, express their wishes for a husband: the elder two want to marry rich and powerful men, unlike the youngest, Maria. One day, a bachelor named Juan passes by their house and becomes enchanted with Maria. They marry, and the girl says she prays to God to give her a pair of children, one with golden hair, the other with silver hair. After their birth, her jealous sisters replace the children for puppies and her husband sentences her to be buried up to the torso near the sink.

Indonesia 
French scholar Gédeon Huet noted tale type ATU 707 "entered into Indonesia". One example is the story Die Schwester der neun und neuzig Brüder ("The Sister of the Ninety-Nine Brothers"), from the Celebes Islands. In this tale, the youngest daughter promises to give birth to 99 boys and a girl, which draws the attention of the prince. When the children are born, the sisters replace the children for inanimate and "worthless" objects. The 100 siblings are rescued by "benevolent spirits", who also give the girl a wooden horse.

In another Indonesian variant from Aceh, Hikayat gumba' Meuïh, Gumba' Meuin, Gumbak Meuih, or Gombak Emas ("The Tale of Goldenhead"), King Hamsöykasa is married to three wives, but hasn't fathered a son by the first two, named Ratna Diwi and Keuncan Ansari. The third wife, Cah Keubandi, of humble origin, gives birth to 100 children in one day: 99 brothers and 1 sister, each of them with hair of gold and diamonds. The first two wives cast the siblings in the water encased in a box and replace them for creatures. The 100 are saved by a gògasi (gěrgasi) couple. The youngest child, the girl, named Gumba' Meuïh (Goldenhead), is told of her royal origins by a "celestial bird", reaches their father's kingdom and reveals the whole truth. The tale continues with the adventures of princess Goldenhead with celestial (adara) prince Lila Bangguna. Like her mother before her, she is also persecuted by the prince's sister and his second wife, but reclaims her right with the help of her 99 brothers. Her son, Mira' Diwangga, marries a princess of Atrah named Cheureupu Intan ("Diamond Sandal"), and fathers a daughter called Gènggöng Intan, who later marries prince Kaharölah of Silan (Ceylon). The hikayat is reported to exist in 4 (quite similar) manuscript versions in the archives of the Library of Leiden University, and contains the episode of petrification of the 99 brothers and their elephant retinue, as they make their way to their father's kingdom.

Myanmar 
In a Burmese tale, The Hundred and One Lobsters, a woman eats 101 magical lobsters, said to give the ability to bear wonderful children, and is made queen. She gives birth to 101 children, 100 sons and a daughter, but the king's second queen replaces them for puppies. The 101 children are saved by the king's pet animals (a sow, a cow, a buffalo and an elephant), which are killed by a ploy of the second queen. At last, they are taken in by a fisherman couple and, some time later, take part in a cock fighting contest against their own father, the king.

In a Burmese tale from the Palaung people, "История Схумо" ("The Story of Schumo"), an elderly couple lives in poverty with their daughter. The king, who had many wives, but no son, marries the girl and she gives birth to a son she names Schumo. The jealous co-wives of the king replace the boy for a puppy, to disgrace their rival. The young queen is expelled and returns to her parents' house with the puppy, while her son survives. The son visits his grandparents' home and sees his mother playing with the dog. She confirms her relationship with the boy by using a jet of her breast milk. Russian scholarship classified the tale as type 707, following Thompson and Roberts' Types of Indic Oral Tales.

Vietnam
In a Vietnamese tale from the Jarai people with the title "Золотистая лань" ("Golden Doe"), a village chief has two co-wives, the elder Fa, cruel and lazy, and the younger Fu, kind and diligent. One day, the chief sights a golden doe in the forest and grabs his bow and arrow to hunt it. He follows it until he reaches a distant where he finds a beautiful girl there, who reveals she is the golden doe. The doe-girl and the village marry. Three years later, the doe-girl is pregnant, and Fa, cunningly, helps her in the delivery of her child. The doe-girl gives birth to three sons, who are taken by Fa and cast in the river in a basket, while she places puppies next to their mother. The village chief sees the animal litter and banishes the doe-girl to the pigpen. Meanwhile, the three boys are rescued by an old woman named Pom in another village, who raises them. Some time later, Fa, the elder co-wife, learns of their survival and goes to the second village to pay them a visit. She gives the boys chicken stew laced with poison. The boys eat and die. Their adoptive mother buries them in her yard; a tree sprouts in their grave, with three beautiful flowers. The flowers draw the attention of the villagers, and Fu, the younger co-wife, goes to check it. Upon seeing the tree, she recognizes it as the doe-girl's boys, so she burns down the tree and the boys are reborn as human beings. Fu takes the boys with them and takes care of them until they grow up as fine young men. The triples decide to make a journey to their father's village: they sail on a boat and dock on a nearby shore. After defeating some robbers, one of the youths enters the village chief's house and releases their doe-mother from her punishment, then takes her away with them.

References 

Female characters in fairy tales
Fictional kings
Fictional queens
Child abandonment
Adoption forms and related practices
Adoption, fostering, orphan care and displacement
ATU 500-559
ATU 700-749